The Torwa dynasty was the ruling family of the Butua kingdom that arose from the collapse of Great Zimbabwe in the sixteenth and seventeenth century, founded perhaps by the legendary Dlembeu.

History

The Torwa dynasty of the kalanga people based itself at the stone city of Khami from 1450 to 1683. Cattle and gold brought prosperity. The new culture at Khami developed both the stone building techniques and the pottery styles found at Great Zimbabwe. Masons continued to refine Great Zimbabwe’s tradition of building precise stone walls.

At Khami several artefacts are found, such as ritual drinking pots, iron and bronze weapons, copper objects and ivory divining pieces. Artifacts from Europe and China are reminders that Khami was once a trade centre.

During this period the first Europeans arrived. The first known European visitor was Antonio Fernandes, a Portuguese "degredado" (convict exile) serving his term in Sofala, who entered the Zimbabwean plateau in 1513.

There had always been an Arab influence in the region, particularly through trade, but this conflicted with Portuguese commercial interests and religion. The fall of the Tolwa state linked to the coming of the Mutapa people from the north and to the Nguni incursions from the south.

In the 1670s a new power arose on the Zimbabwean plateau led by a military ruler called the Changamire. His army of followers, known as the Lozwi, overthrew the Tolwa dynasty, drove the Portuguese from the Zimbabwean plateau in 1693, and established the Rozwi Empire (also called Mambo).

See also
Zimbabwe
Dynasty

External links 
 https://web.archive.org/web/20091102140815/http://encarta.msn.com/text_761572628___107/Africa.html
 www.karibahouseboats.com/about-zimbabwe.htm
 www.infotour-africa.com/zimbabwe_history.htm

History of Zimbabwe
Former monarchies of Africa
States and territories established in 1450
1683 disestablishments
Former countries in Africa